Armellini is a surname of Italian origin. Notable people with the surname include:

Alejandro Armellini (born 1966), Uruguayan teacher
Andrea Armellini (born 1970), retired Italian football goalkeeper
Antonio Armellini (born 1943), retired Italian diplomat
Augusto Armellini (–1912), Italian politician.
Carlo Armellini (1777–1863), Italian politician, activist and jurist
Faustina Bracci Armellini (1785–1857), Italian pastellist
Francesco Armellini Pantalassi de' Medici (1470–1528) – cardinal of the Roman Catholic Church
Mariano Armellini (1852–1896), Italian archaeologist and historian
Marco Armellini (born 1960), former Italian professional tennis player
Quirino Armellini (1889–1975), Italian general 
Romina Armellini (born 1984), Italian swimmer

See also
6855 Armellini, asteroid

Italian-language surnames